Santa Catalina is a Gothic-style, Roman Catholic church located in the city of Valencia, Spain at the southern end of Plaza de la Reina.

History

Iglesia de Santa Catarina was built in the early 13th century at the site of a prior mosque. Most of the interior was rebuilt after a fire in 1548 acquiring the baroque style. It has a 16th-century portal of classicist style. The imposing bell tower, with a hexagonal base and five levels, once the site of a minaret, was rebuilt in a Baroque fashion between 1688 and 1705 using the designs of Juan Bautista Viñes. Today still presents the 13th-century gothic exterior. The church was restored in 1785.

The bells were melted in London in 1729 and later, in 1914, the clock was added. During the restoration carried out in 2012, when they went to repair the clock they realized that the machinery was relatively modern and had no value, so it was decided to remove it and adding again the old bell that had been removed in 1902.

In 1936, the church's interior was assaulted and burned by Republican militiamen. In the 1950s, what managed to be saved was restored, and some classist additions that covered the gothic façade were removed.

References 

Catalina
Baroque architecture in the Valencian Community
Gothic architecture in the Valencian Community
13th-century Roman Catholic church buildings in Spain
Towers completed in 1705
Former mosques in Spain